Marrinan is a surname. Notable people with the surname include:

Corinne Marrinan (born 1974), American producer and screenwriter
Padraig Marrinan (1906–1973), Irish painter